The Giles G-200 is an American aerobatic homebuilt aircraft that was produced by AkroTech Aviation of Scappoose, Oregon. When it was available the aircraft was supplied as a complete ready-to-fly-aircraft or a kit for amateur construction. The first customer-built aircraft made its first flight on May 26, 1996. AkroTech Aviation went out of business and the design is no longer in production.

Design and development
The G-200 features a cantilever low-wing, a single-seat enclosed cockpit under a bubble canopy, fixed conventional landing gear with wheel pants and a single engine in tractor configuration.

The aircraft is made from composites. When the aircraft was in production custom cockpit sizes were also available as options.

The manufacturer estimates the construction time from the supplied quick-build kit as 1000 hours.

Operational history
By 1998 the company reported that 26 kits had been sold and one aircraft was flying.

In December 2013 ten examples were registered in the United States with the Federal Aviation Administration, with a further two no longer registered. There was one G-200 registered with Transport Canada.

Pilot Mike Goulian described flying the G-200:

Specifications (G-200)

See also
List of aerobatic aircraft

References

External links

Photo of a G-200

G-200
1990s United States sport aircraft
Single-engined tractor aircraft
Low-wing aircraft
Homebuilt aircraft
Aerobatic aircraft